Copa Martini & Rossi was the name of a series of friendly football matches between FC Barcelona and several distinguished European teams during the decade of the 1940s. The winner of the game received a silver cup inscribed with the name of the sponsor, the Italian Multinational Martini & Rossi.

The matches took place at Barcelona's Les Corts, usually as the last game of the season, with which homage was given to the retiring players, or as a Christmas season game. This tournament is considered the precursor to the Trofeu Joan Gamper.

This title should not be confused with the Trofeo Martini & Rossi, award that during the same decade was granted to the First Division team with the best goal difference record during the year, and which the FC Barcelona won a record of six times.

Tournaments 
All the edition of the tournament are presented in the following table:

Notes and references 

FC Barcelona
Catalan football friendly trophies